Giulio Rinaldi (13 February 1935 – 18 July 2011) was an Italian boxer. He competed at the 1956 Summer Olympics where he was eliminated in the first bout.

Pro career
During his thirteen and-a-half-year professional career from 1957 to 1970, Rinaldi compiled a record of 44–16–5, with 13 knockouts. He won the Italian light heavyweight title in 1960, and defeated Archie Moore in a non-title bout the same year. In June 1961, Rinaldi lost a 15-round decision in a rematch with Moore for the NYSAC World Light Heavyweight title. He then went undefeated in ten consecutive fights, and went on to decision 34–0–4 Erich Schoppner over 15 rounds to win the European Light Heavyweight title in 1963. He lost the EBU title by ninth round disqualification to Gustav Sholtz in 1964. He regained the vacant European Light Heavyweight title with a thirteenth round stoppage of Klaus Gumpert in 1965, before losing it by 15 round decision to Piero La Papa in 1966.

Moving up to heavyweight, Rinaldi won only one of his next ten bouts, drawing and losing to future European Heavyweight champion Juergen Blin. In 1970, Rinaldi returned to light heavyweight, regaining the Italian Light Heavyweight title for the first time in ten years by an eight-round disqualification over Gianfranco Maccia. Rinaldi's career ended later in 1970 when he lost the Italian Light Heavyweight title with a 12-round decision loss to unbeaten Domenico Adinolfi, who went on to win the European Light Heavyweight title. He died on 18 July 2011, in his residence in Anzio, Italy.

Professional boxing record

|-
|align="center" colspan=8|44 Wins (13 knockouts, 28 decisions, 3 DQs), 16 Losses (4 knockouts, 8 decisions, 4 DQs), 5 Draws, 2 No Contests 
|-
| align="center" style="border-style: none none solid solid; background: #e3e3e3"|Result
| align="center" style="border-style: none none solid solid; background: #e3e3e3"|Record
| align="center" style="border-style: none none solid solid; background: #e3e3e3"|Opponent
| align="center" style="border-style: none none solid solid; background: #e3e3e3"|Type
| align="center" style="border-style: none none solid solid; background: #e3e3e3"|Round
| align="center" style="border-style: none none solid solid; background: #e3e3e3"|Date
| align="center" style="border-style: none none solid solid; background: #e3e3e3"|Location
| align="center" style="border-style: none none solid solid; background: #e3e3e3"|Notes
|-align=center
|Loss
|
|align=left| Domenico Adinolfi
|KO
|5
|23 October 1970
|align=left| Rome, Lazio
|align=left|
|-
|Win
|
|align=left| Gianfranco Macchia
|DQ
|8
|22 August 1970
|align=left| Anzio, Lazio
|align=left|
|-
|Win
|
|align=left| Kosie Smith
|PTS
|10
|23 May 1970
|align=left| Ellis Park Stadium, Johannesburg, Gauteng
|align=left|
|-
|Win
|
|align=left| Vasco Faustino
|PTS
|8
|18 April 1970
|align=left| Anzio, Lazio
|align=left|
|-
|Loss
|
|align=left| Horst Benedens
|PTS
|8
|24 January 1970
|align=left| Sportpalast, Schoeneberg, Berlin
|align=left|
|-
|Loss
|
|align=left| Juergen Blin
|PTS
|10
|29 May 1969
|align=left| Grugahalle, Essen, North Rhine-Westphalia
|align=left|
|-
|Loss
|
|align=left| Wilhelm Von Homburg
|TKO
|7
|2 April 1969
|align=left| Sportpalast, Schoeneberg, Berlin
|align=left|
|-
|Win
|
|align=left| Wilhelm Von Homburg
|PTS
|10
|14 February 1969
|align=left| Ernst Merck Halle, Hamburg
|align=left|
|-
|Loss
|
|align=left| Wilhelm Von Homburg
|TKO
|5
|3 January 1969
|align=left| Sportpalast, Schoeneberg, Berlin
|align=left|
|-
|Loss
|
|align=left| Bob Dunlop
|PTS
|10
|18 November 1968
|align=left| Sydney Stadium, Sydney
|align=left|
|-
|Draw
|
|align=left| Johnny Hendrickson
|PTS
|8
|3 May 1968
|align=left| Palazzetto dello Sport, Rome, Lazio
|align=left|
|-
|Loss
|
|align=left| Billy Walker
|DQ
|1
|13 February 1967
|align=left| Belle Vue Zoological Gardens, Belle Vue, Manchester
|align=left|
|-
|No Contest
|
|align=left| Giulio Saraudi
|NC
|5
|2 December 1966
|align=left| Palazzetto dello Sport, Rome, Lazio
|align=left|
|-
|Draw
|
|align=left| Juergen Blin
|PTS
|10
|2 September 1966
|align=left| Mungersdorfer Stadion, Cologne, North Rhine-Westphalia
|align=left|
|-
|Loss
|
|align=left| Piero Del Papa
|PTS
|15
|11 March 1966
|align=left| Rome, Lazio
|align=left|
|-
|Win
|
|align=left| Klaus Peter Gumpert
|RTD
|13
|8 July 1965
|align=left| Hilton Hotel, Rome, Lazio
|align=left|
|-
|Win
|
|align=left| Jose Menno
|PTS
|10
|7 May 1965
|align=left| Rome, Lazio
|align=left|
|-
|No Contest
|
|align=left| Jose Menno
|NC
|4
|19 February 1965
|align=left| Rome, Lazio
|align=left|
|-
|Win
|
|align=left| Don Turner
|KO
|8
|22 January 1965
|align=left| Palazzetto dello Sport, Rome, Lazio
|align=left|
|-
|Draw
|
|align=left| Herschel Jacobs
|PTS
|10
|18 September 1964
|align=left| Palazzetto dello Sport, Rome, Lazio
|align=left|
|-
|Win
|
|align=left| Johnny Alford
|PTS
|10
|29 July 1964
|align=left| Rome, Lazio
|align=left|
|-
|Win
|
|align=left| Floyd McCoy
|PTS
|10
|10 April 1964
|align=left| Palazzetto dello Sport, Rome, Lazio
|align=left|
|-
|Loss
|
|align=left| Gustav Scholz
|DQ
|9
|4 April 1964
|align=left| Westfalenhallen, Dortmund, North Rhine-Westphalia
|align=left|
|-
|Loss
|
|align=left| Hans Werner Wohlers
|DQ
|2
|28 February 1964
|align=left| Palazzetto dello Sport, Rome, Lazio
|align=left|
|-
|Win
|
|align=left| Bob Young
|KO
|9
|3 February 1964
|align=left| Bologna, Emilia-Romagna
|align=left|
|-
|Win
|
|align=left| Erich Schoppner
|PTS
|15
|23 May 1963
|align=left| Stadio Flaminio, Rome, Lazio
|align=left|
|-
|Draw
|
|align=left| Wayne Bethea
|PTS
|10
|5 April 1963
|align=left| Palazzetto dello Sport, Rome, Lazio
|align=left|
|-
|Draw
|
|align=left| Bobo Olson
|PTS
|10
|14 December 1962
|align=left| Palazzetto dello Sport, Rome, Lazio
|align=left|
|-
|Win
|
|align=left| Chic Calderwood
|PTS
|15
|28 September 1962
|align=left| Palazzetto dello Sport, Rome, Lazio
|align=left|
|-
|Win
|
|align=left| Lino Rendon
|DQ
|6
|22 June 1962
|align=left| Palazzetto dello Sport, Rome, Lazio
|align=left|
|-
|Win
|
|align=left| Billy Ryan
|PTS
|10
|30 March 1962
|align=left| Rome, Lazio
|align=left|
|-
|Win
|
|align=left| Renato Moraes
|PTS
|10
|19 January 1962
|align=left| Palazzetto dello Sport, Rome, Lazio
|align=left|
|-
|Win
|
|align=left| Helmut Ball
|TKO
|7
|20 December 1961
|align=left| Palazzetto dello Sport, Rome, Lazio
|align=left|
|-
|Win
|
|align=left| Dieter Wemhoner
|PTS
|10
|24 November 1961
|align=left| Palazzetto dello Sport, Rome, Lazio
|align=left|
|-
|Win
|
|align=left| Rudolf Nehring
|KO
|4
|27 October 1961
|align=left| Palazzetto dello Sport, Rome, Lazio
|align=left|
|-
|Win
|
|align=left| Roque Maravilla
|PTS
|10
|20 September 1961
|align=left| Rome, Lazio
|align=left|
|-
|Loss
|
|align=left| Archie Moore
|UD
|15
|10 June 1961
|align=left| Madison Square Garden, New York City
|align=left|
|-
|Win
|
|align=left| "Kid" Sixto Rodriguez
|PTS
|10
|24 March 1961
|align=left| Rome, Lazio
|align=left|
|-
|Win
|
|align=left| Freddie Mack
|PTS
|10
|24 February 1961
|align=left| Rome, Lazio
|align=left|
|-
|Win
|
|align=left| Sonny Ray
|PTS
|10
|13 January 1961
|align=left| Rome, Lazio
|align=left|
|-
|Win
|
|align=left| Archie Moore
|PTS
|10
|29 October 1960
|align=left| Palazzetto dello Sport, Rome, Lazio
|align=left|
|-
|Win
|
|align=left| Johnny Halafihi
|PTS
|10
|1 October 1960
|align=left| Palazzetto dello Sport, Rome, Lazio
|align=left|
|-
|Win
|
|align=left| Donnie Fleeman
|PTS
|10
|9 July 1960
|align=left| Rome, Lazio
|align=left|
|-
|Win
|
|align=left| Germinal Ballarin
|PTS
|12
|4 June 1960
|align=left| Rome, Lazio
|align=left|
|-
|Win
|
|align=left| Leen Jansen
|PTS
|10
|27 April 1960
|align=left| Palazzetto dello Sport, Rome, Lazio
|align=left|
|-
|Win
|
|align=left| Santo Amonti
|TKO
|2
|8 March 1960
|align=left| Palazzetto dello Sport, Rome, Lazio
|align=left|
|-
|Loss
|
|align=left| Dieter Wemhoner
|PTS
|8
|21 November 1959
|align=left| Palasport di San Siro, Milan, Lombardy
|align=left|
|-
|Win
|
|align=left| Horst Niche
|PTS
|10
|16 October 1959
|align=left| Rome, Lazio
|align=left|
|-
|Win
|
|align=left| Rocco Mazzola
|PTS
|10
|2 October 1959
|align=left| Rome, Lazio
|align=left|
|-
|Win
|
|align=left| Jose Mariano Moracia Ibanes
|PTS
|10
|15 August 1959
|align=left| Sanremo, Liguria
|align=left|
|-
|Loss
|
|align=left| Rocco Mazzola
|TKO
|1
|13 July 1959
|align=left| Rome, Lazio
|align=left|
|-
|Loss
|
|align=left| Johnny Halafihi
|PTS
|10
|13 April 1959
|align=left| Nottingham Ice Stadium, Nottingham, Nottinghamshire
|align=left|
|-
|Win
|
|align=left| Sammy Langford
|TKO
|5
|12 March 1959
|align=left| Rome, Lazio
|align=left|
|-
|Win
|
|align=left| Artenio Calzavara
|PTS
|10
|8 January 1959
|align=left| Rome, Lazio
|align=left|
|-
|Win
|
|align=left| Hans Ducree
|TKO
|7
|27 November 1958
|align=left| Rome, Lazio
|align=left|
|-
|Loss
|
|align=left| Ahmed Boulgroune
|DQ
|4
|6 October 1958
|align=left| Palazzetto dello Sport, Rome, Lazio
|align=left|
|-
|Win
|
|align=left| Tino Albanese
|KO
|1
|12 July 1958
|align=left| Anzio, Lazio
|align=left|
|-
|Win
|
|align=left| Uwe Janssen
|PTS
|8
|27 May 1958
|align=left| Palazzetto dello Sport, Rome, Lazio
|align=left|
|-
|Win
|
|align=left| Jacques Dufreney
|DQ
|6
|13 April 1958
|align=left| Anzio, Lazio
|align=left|
|-
|Win
|
|align=left|Otello Meneghini
|KO
|2
|7 March 1958
|align=left| La Spezia, Liguria
|align=left|
|-
|Win
|
|align=left| Giovanni Moriggi
|PTS
|6
|14 January 1958
|align=left| Rome, Lazio
|align=left|
|-
|Win
|
|align=left| Loreto Vari
|PTS
|6
|18 December 1957
|align=left| Rome, Lazio
|align=left|
|-
|Win
|
|align=left| Aldo Brunetti
|TKO
|5
|19 October 1957
|align=left| Rome, Lazio
|align=left|
|-
|Loss
|
|align=left| Domenico Baccheschi
|PTS
|6
|31 July 1957
|align=left| Rome, Lazio
|align=left|
|-
|Win
|
|align=left| Widmer Milandri
|TKO
|4
|24 April 1957
|align=left| Rome, Lazio
|align=left|
|-
|Win
|
|align=left| Angelo Greco
|PTS
|6
|13 April 1957
|align=left| Rome, Lazio
|align=left|
|-
|Win
|
|align=left| Giuliano Bianchi
|TKO
|5
|23 March 1957
|align=left| Rome, Lazio
|align=left|
|}

References

External links
 

1935 births
2011 deaths
People from Anzio
Olympic boxers of Italy
Boxers at the 1956 Summer Olympics
Italian male boxers
Middleweight boxers
Sportspeople from the Metropolitan City of Rome Capital